Arctelene is a genus of moths in the family Erebidae.

Species
 Arctelene lateritia (Černý, 2009)
 Arctelene rufescens Kirti & N.S. Gill, 2008
 Arctelene uncodes Kirti & N.S. Gill, 2008

References

 , 2008, A new genus and two new species of Lithosiinae (Lepidoptera: Arctiidae) from India, Oriental Insects 42: 359-362.

Nudariina
Moth genera